Arthur Buxton (born 15 May 1908) was an English professional footballer who played as a left-back. He made appearances in the English Football League for Wrexham and New Brighton. He also played for Worksop Town, Bangor City and Wellington.

References

1908 births
Date of death unknown
English footballers
Association football defenders
English Football League players
Worksop Town F.C. players
Wrexham A.F.C. players
Bangor City F.C. players
Wellington A.F.C. players
New Brighton A.F.C. players
People from Barlborough
Footballers from Derbyshire